The 2009 BSI Challenger Lugano was a professional tennis tournament played on outdoor red clay courts. It was part of the Tretorn SERIE+ of the 2009 ATP Challenger Tour. It took place in Lugano, Switzerland between 8 and 14 June 2009.

Singles entrants

Seeds

 Rankings are as of May 25, 2010.

Other entrants
The following players received wildcards into the singles main draw:
  Stéphane Bohli
  Michael Lammer
  Bernard Tomic
  Stanislas Wawrinka

The following players received entry a special Exempt into the singles main draw:
  Peter Luczak

The following players received entry from the qualifying draw:
  Andrea Arnaboldi
  Alberto Brizzi
  Alessio di Mauro
  Cristian Villagrán

Champions

Singles

 Stanislas Wawrinka def.  Potito Starace, 7–5, 6–3

Doubles

 Johan Brunström /  Jean-Julien Rojer def.  Pablo Cuevas /  Sergio Roitman, walkover

References
Official website
ITF search 

BSI Challenger Lugano
Tretorn SERIE+ tournaments
Clay court tennis tournaments
Tennis tournaments in Switzerland
2009 in Swiss tennis